Deserticossus tsingtauana is a moth in the family Cossidae. It is found in Russia (Primorye), Mongolia, China, Korea and northern Vietnam. The habitat consists of forests.

The length of the forewings is 24–31 mm for males and 32–34 mm for females. The forewings are dark-brown with a dark pattern. The hindwings are uniform brown. Adults are on wing from May to August.

References

Natural History Museum Lepidoptera generic names catalog

Cossinae
Moths described in 1912
Moths of Asia